Dera Ghazi Khan, abbreviated as D.G. Khan, is a city in the southwestern part of Punjab, Pakistan. It is the 19th largest city of Pakistan by population. Lying west of the Indus River, it is the headquarters of Dera Ghazi Khan District and Dera Ghazi Khan Division.

History

Foundation

Dera Ghazi Khan was founded in the end of 15th century when Baloch tribes were invited to settle the region by Shah Husein, of the Langah Sultanate of Multan, and was named after Ghazi Khan, son of Haji Khan Mirani who was a Baloch chieftain. Dera Ghazi Khan region was part of Multan province of the Mughal Empire. Fifteen generations of Miranis had ruled the area.
In the beginning of the 19th century, Zaman Khan was the ruler of Dera  Ghazi Khan under Kabul. He was later attacked by the Sikh Army from Multan, under the command of Khushal Singh general of Ranjit Singh. and thus Dera Ghazi Khan came under Sikh rule.

Post independence
After the success of the Pakistan Movement, which led to the independence of Pakistan in 1947, the minority Hindus and Sikhs migrated to India while many Muslim refugees from India settled down in the Dera Ghazi Khan District. Many Hindus and Sikhs from Dera Ghazi Khan settled in Delhi and founded Derawal Nagar along with the migrants from Dera Ismail Khan.

Geography and climate
Dera Ghazi Khan is located at 30'03" N and 70'38" E. The overall climate of the city is dry with little rainfall. The winter is mild and dry, but it is very hot in summer. The prevailing wind direction is north–south. Due to the barren mountains of  Koh-Suleman and the sandy soil of the area, windstorms are common in the summer. During summer, the temperatures are generally amongst the highest in Pakistan. Fort Munro, located on the edge of Punjab Province, has relatively cooler weather. In winter, scattered snowfall has been reported.

Civic administration
Dera Ghazi Khan Municipal Corporation is administratively subdivided into seven Union Councils. The city is also the headquarters of Dera Ghazi Khan District and administrative capital of Dera Ghazi Khan Division.

Education

Colleges

 Ghazi University is a university in Dera Ghazi Khan, Punjab, Pakistan. The university was established in 2012 at the initiative of the Chief Minister of the Punjab Muhammad Shahbaz Sharif. It is named after Baloch mercenary Ghazi Khan. The university is situated in the center of city near pull daat and college chock. Since its inception, GU has been operated only on additional charge basis. Prof. Dr. Muhammad Tufail (TI) assumed the charge as a permanent Vice Chancellor (VC), on Sept. 18, 2018. Major infrastructure and development process started in university after Chief Minister Usman Buzdar hold the CM office in 2018. Multiple projects worth million of rupees were initiated on special initiative of CM Usman Buzdar. 
 Mir Chaker Khan Rind University of Technology MCUT is public sector Engineering University providing Engineering education in various discipline of Technology. It is necessary in public interest to make provisions for the establishment of Mir Chakar Khan Rind University of Technology in Dera Ghazi Khan to promote research and development for purposes of producing high quality technical human resource to cope with the present day requirements. University was established on directions of CM Usman Buzdar 
 College of Agriculture, DG Khan Sub-Campus University of Agriculture, Faisalabad. (CADGK) 
 Indus International Institute: It is affiliated with National College of Business Administration and Economics has been established by private sector. For the needs of remote area students, the institute has its own buses to facilitate the transport availability for the students. Indus has a library and Computer Lab as well.

 The College of Education: It was established in 1989 under the affiliation of Bahauddin Zakariya University, Multan. The college became a constituent institution of the University of Education in 2002 and is in its new building adjacent to the Shah Faisal (Bihari) Colony. The campus has a hostel for boys and onel for girls. The campus offers teacher education programs like BEd Secondary, MEd, M.A. Education and B.A. BEd's several private sector colleges also exist in this city.
Ghazi Khan Medical College: The government decided to establish a medical college in Dera Ghazi Khan to improve the facilities in southern part of the province. Ghazi Khan Medical College classes were started in 2010 in Q.M.C Bahawapur. The foundation stone for Ghazi University and Dera Ghazi Khan Medical College was laid in December 2011. Classes shifted from Q.M.C Bahawalpur to Ghazi Khan Medical College in March 2012. Niaz Ahmed Baloch was appointed as a first principal of the Medical College. The Medical and Dental College has been developed as a state-of-the-art medical institution imparting accredited and approved medical education and research. The D.H. Hospital and Research Institute, which will be a research-oriented teaching hospital, will fulfill the requirement of training and research of medical students. The curriculum of the Medical and Dental College will be in line with the PM&DC regulations and international health standards.

Technology and specialization
 UAF College of Agriculture, Dera Ghazi Khan: It is a constituent college of the University of Agriculture Faisalabad located near the airport imparts training in the degree of BSc (Hons.) Agriculture. The college consists of teaching sections of Plant Breeding and Genetics, Horticulture, Agronomy, Soil and Forestry Range Management and Wildlife, Agricultural Entomology, Plant Pathology, Animal Production and Health, Agricultural Engineering and Technology, and Social Sciences and Rural Development. It aims to develop as a university.
 Govt. Institute of Technology: It is situated at airport road, and is one of the biggest institutes in the region offering diploma and BTech classes in more than ten technologies in morning and evening shifts. Diploma courses in technologies are Civil, Mechanical, Electrical, Auto-mechanical, Petroleum, Chemical, Petrochemical, I.T. and Computer etc.

Universities

The government has established a state-of-the-art Ghazi University in Dera Ghazi Khan since 2011 near airport. For this purpose 1000 acres of land has been acquired for the next 50 years requirement of the university. The foundation stone for Ghazi University and Ghazi Medical College was laid in December 2011. The Govt. Postgraduate College, FAU Agriculture College and Ghazi Medical College will work under this university. Vice Chancellor of Islamia University Bahawalpur Dr. Mukhtar Ahmed has given additional charge of Ghazi University v.c since 11.06.2014. The Virtual University of Pakistan has established its campus here since 2004 which is providing both campus based and distance learning education primarily based on IT tools and technology. Another prominent educational organisation is the Allama Iqbal Open University campus. The government has approved Akhuwat University of Engineering and Technology in Dera Ghazi Khan since 2012..Mir chakar khan rind university of technology.

External links
 MCUT official website

Demographics
Most people are Sunni Muslims. The majority of the population is poor but they have been ruled by the rich landlords and chiefs of Baloch tribes which played a significant role in the national and provincial politics. Some of these feudals use the title Sardar for themselves, including the Chief Minister of Punjab Usman Buzdar, former President of Pakistan Farooq Leghari, Governors of the Punjab Zulfiqar Ali Khosa and Latif Khosa, Mir Badshah Qaisrani, Sardar of the Malghani Balouch tribe, Chief Minister of Punjab Dost Muhammad Khosa, Chief Secretary of Punjab, Nasir Mehmood Khosa, Former Inspector General Police of Punjab, Tariq Khosa, and Supreme Court Judge Asif Khosa. The city is one of the oldest districts in South Asia. Dera Ghazi Khan did not develop like other cities in Punjab. Based on the surveys of 2004–2005, Dera Ghazi Khan district is considered one of the twenty poorest districts of Pakistan with about 51% of its population living below the poverty line.

Population
Historical populations of Dera Ghazi Khan city.

Transport

Airport

Culture

Fairs and festivals
 Sangh Mela, is a Vaisakhi fair during March and April, and has been celebrated in Sakhi Sarwar by people coming from Jhang and Faisalabad for centuries. This festival is celebrated by Hindus and Muslims, especially at the time of wheat harvesting. In some places it is known as Basant. Throughout history, a large number of followers coming from different religions became the followers of Sakhi Sarwar. Max Arthur Macauliffe, a colonial office appointed in Punjab, observed in 1875 that not only Muslims but Hindus also visited the shrines during the urs. In the 1911 census of India, 79,085 Sikhs reported to be followers of Sakhi Sarwar.

Cuisine
 Sohan Halwa is a traditional sweet made by boiling a mixture of water, sugar, milk and wheatflour (coarse pieces)/cornflour until it becomes solid.

Notable people 
 Niaz Ahmad Akhtar (Pakistani Academic)
 Farooq Leghari (former President of Pakistan)
 Mohsin Naqvi (Poet)
 Prabhu Chawla (Journalist)
 Asif Saeed Khosa (Chief Justice of Supreme Court of Pakistan)
 Nasir Khosa (Chief Secretary of Punjab)
 Latif Khosa (former Governor of Punjab)
 Amjad Farooq Khan (MNA)
 Zulfiqar Ali Khosa (former Governor of Punjab)
 Sardar Dost Muhammad Khosa (former Chief Minister of Punjab)
 Tauqeer Nasir (Actor)
 Hafiz Abdul Kareem (Member of the National Assembly of Pakistan - MNA)
 Sardar Awais Ahmed Leghari (MPA, former MNA)
 Sardar Usman Buzdar (Chief Minister of Punjab)
 Zartaj Gul (MNA) Federal Minister For Climate Change
 Jamal Leghari (former MPA Punjab Assembly)

Press and media
Daily Jang is published from Dera Ghazi Khan along with many local newspapers in Urdu, Saraiki and Balochi languages. The Daily Kasak is also published in the city.

Bibliography 
 "How Pakistan Made Nuclear Fuel" by Munir Ahmad Khan, former chairperson of the Pakistan Atomic Energy Commission: Islamabad The Nation 7 February 1998, page 7 [Pakistan: Article on How Pakistan Made Nuclear Fuel: FBIS-NES-98-042 : 11 February 1998].

References

Dera Ghazi Khan District
Cities in Pakistan
Cities in Punjab (Pakistan)
Cities and towns in Punjab, Pakistan
Populated places in Dera Ghazi Khan District
Populated places established in 1910
Populated places in Punjab, Pakistan